Lori Ann Endicott (born August 1, 1967) is a retired female volleyball player from the United States. She played for the University of Nebraska and then for the U.S. national team, winning a bronze medal at the 1992 Summer Olympics.

Career

High school
Endicott attended Willard High School in Willard, Missouri. She helped the volleyball team win the 1981 Missouri state championship and was an all-conference selection in 1982, 1983, and 1984. Endicott also played basketball and was named to the basketball all-state team in 1984 and 1985.

College
Endicott then played volleyball for the University of Nebraska. She helped the team win four Big Eight Conference titles from 1985 to 1988. In 1986, Nebraska finished second at the NCAA championships. Endicott was named the Big Eight Player of the Year in 1987 and 1988. She finished her career at Nebraska with school records for assists in a single season, assists in a career, and service aces in a career. Her number was retired in 1992.

International
Endicott joined the U.S. national team in 1989. In 1990, she was named the outstanding setter at the World Challenge Cup and the FIVB Super Four, and she helped the U.S. win the bronze medal at the World Championships. She was then named the best setter at the 1991 NORCECA Zone Championship and the 1992 FIVB Super Four. She helped the U.S. win the bronze medal at the 1992 Summer Olympics and was named best setter at that tournament, as well.

In 1993, Endicott was named best setter at the World Championship Qualification Tournament. In 1995, she helped the U.S. win gold medals at the World Grand Prix and Canada Cup and the silver medal at the Pan American Games. She played in the 1996 Summer Olympics.

Personal
Endicott was born in Kansas City, Missouri, on August 1, 1967. She married Mark Vandersnick in 1993.

References

1967 births
Living people
Olympic bronze medalists for the United States in volleyball
Volleyball players at the 1992 Summer Olympics
Volleyball players at the 1996 Summer Olympics
Nebraska Cornhuskers women's volleyball players
Sportspeople from Kansas City, Missouri
American women's volleyball players
Medalists at the 1992 Summer Olympics
Pan American Games medalists in volleyball
Pan American Games silver medalists for the United States
Medalists at the 1995 Pan American Games